K. P. Kuruvilla was an Anglican bishop: he was  the fifth Bishop of North Kerala.

References

 Church of South India clergy
 Anglican bishops of North Kerala
21st-century Anglican bishops